The Dark Griffin is a 2009 fantasy novel by K.J. Taylor, the first in the Fallen Moon series, followed by The Griffin's Flight.

Plot synopsis

The land of Cymria is ruled by those humans who can communicate with, and work with, the griffins, with both rogue humans and wild griffins treated poorly. For Arren Cardockson, the main protagonist, who has risen to his position because a griffin chose him, his background means that he does not have access to justice. For the black griffin, his inability to communicate with humans means he does not understand the human world. Each of the pair must fight for survival, and for freedom.

Critical reception

AussieReviews.com said that the novel was 'gripping', and named it suitable for both adult and older teen readers alike.

The novel was also nominated for the 2009 Aurealis Award for best fantasy novel.

2009 Australian novels
Australian fantasy novels